Eléonor Sana (born 1 July 1997) is a Belgian visually impaired alpine skier. Sana won a bronze medal in the women's visually impaired downhill event during the 2018 Winter Paralympics, her first Paralympic medal after competing in her maiden Paralympic event.

Sana was the flagbearer for Belgium at the 2018 Winter Paralympics during the opening ceremony. During her events at the 2018 Paralympics, Sana paired with her sister, Chloe Sana, who skied as her sighted guide.

Sana was born on July 1, 1997, in Woluwe in the Brussels region. When she was 6 weeks old, she developed bilateral genetic retinoblastoma, a cancer that affects the retina of both eyes. Having gone blind as a result of that disease, she took up alpine skiing in 2014.

References

External links 
 

1997 births
Alpine skiers at the 2018 Winter Paralympics
Belgian female alpine skiers
Belgian blind people
Living people
Medalists at the 2018 Winter Paralympics
Paralympic alpine skiers of Belgium
Paralympic athletes with a vision impairment
Paralympic bronze medalists for Belgium
Paralympic medalists in alpine skiing